Suillia bicolor is a Palearctic species of Heleomyzidae.

References

External links
Images representing Suillia bicolor at BOLD

Heleomyzidae
Diptera of Europe
Insects described in 1838